The 2018–19 Ligue 1 season, also known as Ligue 1 Conforama for sponsorship reasons, was the 81st season since its establishment. The season began on 10 August 2018 and concluded on 24 May 2019. Paris Saint-Germain were the defending champions.

On 21 April, Paris Saint-Germain won their second consecutive Ligue 1 title and eighth title overall following Lille's 0–0 draw against Toulouse.

Teams
Twenty teams competed in the league, with two promoted teams from Ligue 2, Reims and Nîmes, replacing the two relegated teams from the 2017–18 Ligue 1 season, Troyes and Metz.

Stadia and locations

Personnel and kits

Managerial changes

League table

Results

Relegation play-offs
The 2018–19 season ended with a relegation play-off between the 18th-placed Ligue 1 team, Dijon, and the winner of the semi-final of the Ligue 2 play-off, Lens, on a two-legged confrontation.

Dijon won 4–2 on aggregate and therefore both clubs remained in their respective leagues.

Number of teams by regions

Season statistics

Top goalscorers

Hat-tricks

Note
4 Player scored 4 goals

References

External links 

 

Ligue 1 seasons
1
France